Fort St. George may refer to:
Fort St. George, Madras
Fort St George In England, a pub in Cambridge, England, named for the Madras fort.
Fort St. George in Bombay, India, around the Casa da Orta, the old castle or keep of the Ortas, the Jewish tenants of the Portuguese king. This fort was later extended and then finally demolished, although a part of its walls remains, where the St. George Hospital now exists.
Fort St. George in St. Marys, Georgia (1755–1780s).
HMAT Wandilla, a ship formerly named Fort St George
Fort St. George in Alaska, a former Russian colony

Maine:
Fort St. George, Popham Colony, Phippsburg, Maine (1607)
Fort St. George (Georgetown-on-Arrowsic)
Fort St. George (Thomaston, Maine), (1720–1762); Attacked by Indians in 1722, 1723, and 1758
Fort St. George (Cushing, Maine) (1719–1759)
Fort St Georges (St George, Maine) (1809)